The Cuchara Formation is a geologic formation in Colorado. It preserves fossils dating back to the Ypresian stage of the Eocene period, or Wasatchian in the NALMA classification.

Fossil content 
The following fossils have been reported from the formation:

Mammals 
Ferae
 Didymictis sp.
Perissodactyla
 Hyracotherium sp.
Placentalia
 Phenacodus intermedius

Wasatchian correlations

See also 
 List of fossiliferous stratigraphic units in Colorado
 Paleontology in Colorado

References

Bibliography 
 

Geologic formations of Colorado
Eocene Series of North America
Paleogene Colorado
Ypresian Stage
Wasatchian
Paleontology in Colorado